St Philip Neri Church Liverpool is home to the Roman Catholic chaplaincy to the universities in Liverpool. It features a Byzantine inspired design by PS Gilby and was built between 1914 and 1920. There are exterior friezes depicting the Last Supper and of Our Lady and the Child Jesus inscribed with the two titles given to Our Lady at the Council of Ephesus in 431 AD, i.e. 'Deipara' (Latin: Mother of God) and 'Theotokos' (Greek : Bearing God) over the door onto Catherine Street. There is also a large stone inscribed in Latin set in the wall bearing the name of Thomas (Whiteside), Archbishop of Liverpool 8 Oct 1916 which dates from the time the church was constructed. The parish grew from the school named 'The Institute' which opened in 1853 in nearby Hope Street. It was visited by the founder of the English Oratorians (Cardinal) John Henry Newman of The Oratory of St Philip Neri in Edgbaston, Birmingham. The parish and later the church were named after Saint Philip Neri in honour of Newman since Philip Neri had founded the original Oratory church in Rome.
Parish registers of the church dating as far back as 1864 can be inspected at the Liverpool Record Office.

In the 1950s, the then priest Dr John Garvin, transformed an adjoining bombsite into a Spanish garden, 'El Jardin della Nuestra Senora' - the Garden of Our Lady. the church became the chaplaincy for the Universities (The University of Liverpool and Liverpool John Moores University) in September 2001 when the old Liverpool University chaplaincy relocated from its previous home on the cathedral precinct, opposite the University of Liverpool Guild of Students, on Mount Pleasant. The church, which is a Grade II* listed building, recently received a grant of £72,000 to help remedy water ingress damage to its mosaic tiling.

See also
Roman Catholic Archdiocese of Liverpool

External links

 http://www.cathchap.org.uk/

Liverpool, Church of Saint Philip Neri
Liverpool, Church of Saint Philip Neri
Church of Saint Philip Neri